Timocles (Ancient Greek: Τιμοκλῆς) was one of the last Athenian comic poets of the Middle Comedy, although Pollux listed him among the writers of New Comedy.   He is known to have won first prize at the Lenaea once, between 330 and 320 BC. The Suda claims that there were two comic poets of this name, but modern scholars equate the two. Unlike most Middle Comedy plays, his works featured a good deal of personal ridicule of public figures, especially orators like Demosthenes and Hyperides.

At least 26, and possibly 28, titles of Timocles' works survive.

 Egyptians
 The Bath-House
 The Farmer
 The Ring
 Delos, or the Man from Delos
 Public Satyrs
 Woman Celebrating the Dionysia
 Dionysus
 Little Dragon
 Letters
 Rejoicing at Another's Misfortune
 Heroes
 Icarians, or Satyrs
 Men from Caunos
 The Centaur, or Dexamenus
 Conisalus
 Forgetfulness
 Men From Marathon
 Neaira
 Orestautocleides
 The Busybody
 The Man from Pontus
 Porphyra
 The Boxer
 Sappho
 Co-Workers
 Philodicastes
 The False-Robbers

References

Works cited
 
 

Ancient Greek dramatists and playwrights
Greek poets
Middle Comic poets
Greek male poets